Broadway, Right Now! is a 1961 album by Mel Tormé and Margaret Whiting, arranged by Russell Garcia.

Track listing 
 "Fireworks"
 "Make Someone Happy" (Betty Comden, Adolph Green, Jule Styne)
 "Tall Hopes" (Cy Coleman, Carolyn Leigh)
 "I Loved You Once in Silence" (Alan Jay Lerner, Frederick Loewe)
 "Like the Wind"
 "Hey, Look Me Over" (Coleman, Leigh)
 "All You Need Is a Quarter"
 "If Ever I Would Leave You" (Lerner, Loewe)
 "Our Language of Love" (Alexandre Breffort, Marguerite Monnot)
 "From a Prison Cell"
 "What's New at the Zoo"
 Medley from Wildcat: "Far Away from Home"/"Angelina" (Coleman, Leigh)/(Coleman, Leigh)

Personnel 
 Mel Tormé – vocals 
 Margaret Whiting –vocals
 Russell Garcia – arranger, conductor

References 

1960 albums
Mel Tormé albums
Margaret Whiting albums
Albums arranged by Russell Garcia (composer)
Vocal duet albums
Verve Records albums
Albums conducted by Russell Garcia (composer)